Limitarianism (Christianity), which teaches that Christ's atonement applies only to the elect 
 Limitarianism (ethical), which asserts prima facie duties to satisfy urgent needs and to prioritize political equality